Jawab ( Answer) is a 1970 Hindi-language drama film, produced by K.G. Vijayarangam, directed by Ramanna under the authority of R.R. Pictures. The film stars Jeetendra, Leena Chandavarkar, Ashok Kumar, and Meena Kumari. The music was composed by Laxmikant Pyarelal. The film is a remake of the Tamil movie Periya Idathu Penn (1963), with M.G.R and B. Saroja Devi, which was first remade as the Telugu movie Sabhash Suri (1964), starring N.T. Rama Rao and Krishna Kumari.

Plot
The film begins in a village where Zamindar Uma Shankar (Ashok Kumar) is a wealthy tyrant. Raja (Jeetendra) is a pleb, always die-hard Zamindar and his smug children Sagar (Prem Chopra) and Chanchal (Leena Chandavarkar). Raja lives with his widowed sister Vidya (Meena Kumari) and falls for Neela (Jyothi Lakshmi), the daughter of his mentor Shambhu Dada (Ulhas). Sagar also woos on Neela when Shambhu conducts a martial arts completion between them. During that time, Chanchal fouls by exploiting her classmate Bajranji (Mehmood) on behalf of wedlock. Ultimately, Raja is defeated and Sagar knits Neela. Afterward, betrayed Bajranji affirms the fact to Raja when he challenges him to marry Chanchal. Moreover, his life takes a pathetic turn by Zamindar molests Vidya which results in her suicide. However, Raja wore, recedes to the city where he meets Bajranji, and they play act. Now, he civilizes Raja one that succeeds in coupling up with Chanchal and mocks them. Meanwhile, Zamindar is haunted by memories of Vidya. Then, getting wind of what worse happened to his sister Raja inflames and reveals his identity. Soon, mysteriously Zamindar is spot dead and Raja is accused. Later, Vidya is uncovered as a real homicide that is still alive. After divulging the actuality and leaves her breath. At last, Chanchal & Sagar repents and pleads pardon from Raja. Finally, the movie ends on a happy note.

Cast
 Ashok Kumar as Zamindar Uma Shankar
 Meena Kumari as Vidya (Raja's Elder Sister)
 Jeetendra as Raja / Rajkumar
 Leena Chandavarkar as Chanchal (Zamindars Daughter)
 Jyothi Lakshmi as Neela
 Prem Chopra as Sagar (Zamindars Son)
 Aruna Irani as Leela
 Mehmood as Bajrang
 Leela Mishra as Raja's Neighbour
 Ulhas as Shambhu (Neela and Leela's Father)

Soundtrack

References

1970 films
1970s Hindi-language films
Films directed by T. R. Ramanna
Films scored by Laxmikant–Pyarelal
Hindi remakes of Tamil films